An instrument amplifier is an electronic device that converts the often barely audible or purely electronic signal of a musical instrument into a larger electronic signal to feed to a loudspeaker. An instrument amplifier is used with musical instruments such as an electric guitar, an electric bass, electric organ, synthesizers and drum machine to convert the signal from the pickup (with guitars and other string instruments and some keyboards) or other sound source (e.g, a synthesizer's signal) into an electronic signal that has enough power, due to being routed through a power amplifier, capable of driving one or more loudspeaker that can be heard by the performers and audience. 

Combination ("combo") amplifiers include a preamplifier, a power amplifier, tone controls, and one or more speakers in a cabinet, a housing or box usually made of hardwood, plywood or particleboard (or, less commonly, moulded plastic). Instrument amplifiers for some instruments are also available without an internal speaker; these amplifiers, called heads, must plug into one or more external speaker cabinets. Instrument amplifiers also have features that let the performer modify the signal's tone, such as changing the equalization (adjusting bass and treble tone) or adding electronic effects such as intentional distortion/overdrive, reverb or chorus effect.

Instrument amplifiers are available for specific instruments, including the electric guitar, electric bass, electric/electronic keyboards, and acoustic instruments such as the mandolin and banjo. Some amplifiers are designed for specific styles of music, such as the "traditional"-style "tweed" guitar amplifiers, such as the Fender Bassman used by blues and country music musicians, and the Marshall amplifiers used by hard rock and heavy metal bands.

Unlike home "hi-fi" amplifiers or public address systems, which are designed to accurately reproduce the source sound signals with as little harmonic distortion as possible and without changing the tone or equalization (at least not unless the hi-fi owner adjusts it themselves with a graphic equalizer), instrument amplifiers are often designed to add additional tonal coloration to the original signal, emphasize (or de-emphasize) certain frequencies (most electric guitar amps roll off the very high frequencies), and, in the case of guitar amplifiers designed for electric guitar or Hammond organ, offer the capability to intentionally add some degree of "overdrive" or distortion to the tone. The two exceptions are keyboard amplifiers designed for use with digital pianos and synthesizers and "acoustic" instrument amplifiers for use with acoustic guitar or fiddle in a folk music setting, which typically aim for a relatively flat frequency response (i.e., no added colouration of the sound) and little or no distortion of the signal.

Types

Guitar amplifiers

A guitar amplifier amplifies the electrical signal of an electric guitar (or, less commonly, with acoustic amplifiers, an acoustic guitar) so that it can drive a loudspeaker at sufficient volume for the performer and audience to hear. Most guitar amplifiers can also modify the instrument's with controls that emphasize or de-emphasize certain frequencies and add electronic effects. String vibrations are sensed by a suitable microphone or pickup, depending on the type of guitar. For electric guitars, strings are almost always made of metal, and the pickup works by electro-magnetic induction (these are called magnetic pickups; they are the most widely used type of pickup on electric guitars). Acoustic guitars do not usually have a built-in pickup or microphone, at least with entry-level and beginner instruments. Some acoustic guitars have a small condenser microphone mounted inside the body, which designed to convert acoustic vibrations into an electrical signal, but usually they do so from direct contact with the strings (replacing the guitar's bridge) or with the guitar's body, rather than having a membrane like general-purpose microphones. Acoustic guitars may also use a piezoelectric pickup, which converts the vibrations of the instrument into an electronic signal. More rarely, a magnetic pickup may be mounted in the sound hole of an acoustic guitar; while magnetic pickups do not have the same acoustic tone that microphones and piezo pickups can produce, magnetic pickups are more resistant to acoustic feedback.

Standard amps
Standard amplifiers, such as the Fender "tweed"-style amps (e.g., the Fender Bassman) and Gibson amps, are often used by traditional rock, blues, and country musicians who wish to create a "vintage" 1950s-style sound. They are used by electric guitarists, pedal steel guitar players, and blues harmonica ("harp") players. Combo amplifiers such as the Fender Super Reverb have powerful, loud tube amplifiers, four 10" speakers, and they often have built-in reverb and "vibrato" effects units. Smaller guitar amps are also available, which have fewer speakers (some have only one speaker) and lighter, less powerful amplifier units. Smaller guitar amps are easier to transport to gigs and sound recording sessions. Smaller amps are widely used in small venue shows (nightclubs) and in recordings, because players can obtain the tone they want without having to have an excessively loud volume. One of the challenge with the large, powerful 4x10 Fender Bassman-type amps is that to get the tone a player wants, they have to turn up the amp to a loud volume.

These amps are designed to produce a variety of sounds ranging from a clean, warm sound (when used in country and soft rock) to a growling, natural overdrive, when the volume is set near its maximum, (when used for blues, rockabilly, psychobilly, and roots rock). These amplifiers usually have a sharp treble roll-off at 5 kHz to reduce the extreme high frequencies, and a bass roll-off at 60–100 Hz to reduce unwanted boominess. The nickname "tweed" refers to the lacquered beige-light brown fabric covering used on these amplifiers. 

The smallest "combo" amplifiers, which are mainly used for individual practice and warm-up purposes, may have only a single 8" or 10" speaker. Some harmonica players use these small combo amplifiers for concert performances, though, because it is easier to create natural overdrive with these lower-powered amplifiers. Larger combo amplifiers, with one 12 inch speaker or two or four 10 or 12 inch speakers are used for club performances and larger venues. For large concert venues such as stadiums, performers may also use an amplifier "head" with several separate speaker cabinets (which usually contain two or four 12" speakers).

Hard rock and heavy metal

Electric guitar amplifiers designed for heavy metal are used to add an aggressive "drive", intensity, and "edge" to the guitar sound with distortion effects, preamplification boost controls (sometimes with multiple stages of preamps), and tone filters. While many of the most expensive, high-end models use 1950s-style tube amplifiers (even in the 2000s), there are also many models that use transistor amplifiers, or a mixture of the two technologies (i.e., a tube preamplifier with a transistor power amplifier). Amplifiers of this type, such as Marshall amplifiers, are used in a range of the louder, heavier genres of rock, including hard rock, heavy metal, and hardcore punk. This type of amplifier is available in a range of formats, ranging from small, self contained combo amplifiers for rehearsal and warm-ups to heavy "heads" that are used with separate speaker cabinets—colloquially referred to as a "stack."

In the late 1960s and early 1970s, public address systems at rock concerts were used mainly for the vocals. As a result, to get a loud electric guitar sound, early heavy metal and rock-blues bands often used "stacks" of 4x12" Marshall speaker cabinets on the stage. In 1969, Jimi Hendrix used four stacks to create a powerful lead sound, and in the early 1970s by the band Blue Öyster Cult used an entire wall of Marshall Amplifiers to create a roaring wall of sound that projected massive volume and sonic power. In the 1980s, metal bands such as Slayer and Yngwie Malmsteen also used "walls" of over 20 Marshall cabinets. However, by the 1980s and 1990s, most of the sound at live concerts was produced by the sound reinforcement system rather than the onstage guitar amplifiers, so most of these cabinets were not connected to an amplifier. Instead, walls of speaker cabinets were used for aesthetic reasons. 

Amplifiers for harder, heavier genres often use valve amplifiers (known as "tube amplifiers" in North America) also. Valve amplifiers are perceived by musicians and fans to have a "warmer" tone than those of transistor amps, particularly when overdriven (turned up to the level that the amplifier starts to clip or shear off the wave forms). Instead of abruptly clipping off the signal at cut-off and saturation levels, the signal is rounded off more smoothly. Vacuum tubes also exhibit different harmonic effects than transistors. In contrast to the "tweed"-style amplifiers, which use speakers in an open-backed cabinet, companies such as Marshall tend to use 12" speakers in a closed-back cabinet. These amplifiers usually allow users to switch between "clean" and distorted tones (or a rhythm guitar-style "crunch" tone and a sustained "lead" tone) with a foot-operated switch.

Bass

Bass amplifiers are designed for bass guitars or more rarely, for upright bass. They differ from amplifiers for the electric guitar in several respects, with extended low-frequency response, and tone controls optimised for the needs of bass players.

Higher-cost bass amplifiers may include built-in bass effects units, such as audio compressor or limiter features, to avoid unwanted distorting at high volume levels and potential damage to speakers; equalizers; and bass overdrive. 

Bass amps may provide an XLR DI output for plugging the bass amp signal directly into a mixing board or PA system. Larger, more powerful bass amplifiers (300 or more watts) are often provided with internal or external metal heat sinks and/or fans to help keep the components cool. 

Speaker cabinets designed for bass usually use larger loudspeakers (or more loudspeakers, such as four ten-inch speakers) than the cabinets used for other instruments, so that they can move the larger amounts of air needed to reproduce low frequencies. Bass players have to use more powerful amplifiers than the electric guitarists, because deep bass frequencies take more power to amplify. While the largest speakers commonly used for regular electric guitar have twelve-inch cones, electric bass speaker cabinets often use 15" speakers. Bass players who play styles of music that require an extended low-range response, such as death metal, sometimes use speaker cabinets with 18" speakers or add a large subwoofer cabinet to their rig.

Speakers for bass instrument amplification tend to be heavier-duty than those for regular electric guitar, and the speaker cabinets are typically more rigidly constructed and heavily braced, to prevent unwanted buzzes and rattles. Bass cabinets often include bass reflex ports, vents or openings in the cabinet, which improve the bass response and low-end, especially at high volumes.

Keyboard
A keyboard amplifier, used for the stage piano, synthesizer, clonewheel organs and similar instruments, is distinct from other types of amplification systems due to the particular challenges associated with keyboards; namely, to provide solid low-frequency sound reproduction and crisp high-frequency sound reproduction. It is typically a combination amplifier that contains a two, three, or four-channel mixer, a pre-amplifier for each channel, equalization controls, a power amplifier, a speaker, and a horn, all in a single cabinet.

Notable exceptions include keyboard amplifiers for specific keyboard types. The vintage Leslie speaker cabinet and modern recreations, which are generally used for Hammond organs,  use a tube amplifier that is often turned up to add a warm, "growling" overdrive. Some electric pianos have built-in amplifiers and speakers, in addition to outputs for external amplification.

Acoustic amplifiers 
These amplifiers are intended for acoustic instruments such as violin ("fiddle"), mandolin, harp, and acoustic guitar—especially for the way musicians play these instruments in quieter genres such as folk and bluegrass. They are similar to keyboard amplifiers, in that they have a relatively flat frequency response and avoid tonal coloration. 

To produce this relatively "clean" sound, these amplifiers often have very powerful amplifiers (up to 800 watts RMS), to provide additional "headroom" and prevent unwanted distortion. Since an 800 watt amplifier built with standard Class AB technology would be heavy, some acoustic amplifier manufacturers use lightweight Class D, "switching amplifiers."

Acoustic amplifier designs strive to produce a clean, transparent, "acoustic" sound that does not—except for reverb and other effects—alter the natural instrument sound, other than to make it louder. Amplifiers often come with a simple mixer to blend signals from a pickup and microphone. Since the early 2000s, it is increasingly common for acoustic amplifiers to provided digital effects, such as reverb and compression. Some also contain feedback-suppressing devices, such as notch filters or parametric equalizers.

Roles
Instrument amplifiers have a different purpose than 'Hi-Fi' (high fidelity) stereo amplifiers in radios and home stereo systems. Hi-fi home stereo amplifiers strive to accurately reproduce signals from pre-recorded music, with as little harmonic distortion as possible. In contrast, instrument amplifiers are add additional tonal coloration to the original signal or emphasize certain frequencies. For electric instruments such as electric guitar, the amplifier helps to create the instrument's tone by boosting the input signal gain and distorting the signal, and by emphasizing frequencies deemed desirable (e.g., low frequencies) and de-emphasizing frequencies deemed undesirable (e.g., very high frequencies).

Size and power rating
In the 1960s and 1970s, large, heavy, high output power amplifiers were preferred for instrument amplifiers, especially for large concerts, because public address systems were generally only used to amplify the vocals. Moreover, in the 1960s, PA systems typically did not use monitor speaker systems to amplify the music for the onstage musicians. Instead, the musicians were expected to have instrument amplifiers that were powerful enough to provide amplification for the stage and audience.  In late 1960s and early 1970s rock concerts, bands often used large stacks of speaker cabinets powered by heavy tube amplifiers such as the Super Valve Technology (SVT) amplifier, which was often used with eight 10" speakers.

However, over subsequent decades, PA systems substantially improved, and used different approaches, such as horn-loaded "bass bins" (in the 1980s) and subwoofers (1990s and 2000s) to amplify bass frequencies. As well, in the 1980s and 1990s, monitor systems substantially improved, which helped sound engineers provide onstage musicians with a better reproduction of their instruments' sound.  

As a result of improvements to PA and monitor systems, musicians in the 2000s no longer need huge, powerful amplifier systems. A small combo amplifier patched into the PA suffices. In the 2000s, virtually all sound reaching the audience in large venues comes from the PA system. Onstage instrument amplifiers are more likely to be at a low volume, because high volume levels onstage make it harder for the sound engineer to control the sound mix. 

As a result, in many large venues much of the onstage sound reaching the musicians now comes from in-ear monitors, not from the instrument amplifiers. While stacks of huge speaker cabinets and amplifiers are still used in concerts (especially in heavy metal), this is often mainly for aesthetics or to create a more authentic tone. The switch to smaller instrument amplifiers makes it easier for musicians to transport their equipment to performances. As well, it makes concert stage management easier at large clubs and festivals where several bands are performing in sequence, because the bands can be moved on and off the stage more quickly.

Amplifier technology 
Instrument amplifiers may be based on thermionic ("tube" or "valve") or solid state (transistor) technology.

Tube amplifiers

Vacuum tubes were the dominant active electronic components in amplifiers from the 1930s through the early 1970s, and tube amplifiers remain preferred by many musicians and producers. Some musicians feel that tube amplifiers produce a "warmer" or more "natural" sound than solid state units, and a more pleasing overdrive sound when overdriven. However, these subjective assessments of the attributes of tube amplifiers' sound qualities are the subject of ongoing debate. Tube amps are more fragile, require more maintenance, and are usually more expensive than solid state amps.

Tube amplifiers produce more heat than solid state amplifiers, but few manufacturers of these units include cooling fans in the chassis. While tube amplifiers do need to attain a proper operating temperature, if the temperature goes above this operating temperature, it may shorten the tubes' lifespan and lead to tonal inconsistencies.

Solid-state amplifiers

By the 1960s and 1970s, semiconductor transistor-based amplifiers began to become more popular because they are less expensive, more resistant to bumps during transportation, lighter-weight, and require less maintenance. In some cases, tube and solid-state technologies are used together in amplifiers. A common setup is the use of a tube preamplifier with a solid-state power amplifier. There are also an increasing range of products that use digital signal processing and digital modeling technology to simulate many different combinations of amp and cabinets. 

The output transistors of solid-state amplifiers can be passively cooled by using metal fins called heatsinks to radiate away the heat. For high-wattage amplifiers (over 800 watts), a fan is often used to move air across internal heatsinks.

Hybrid
The most common hybrid amp design is to use a tube preamp with a solid state power amplifier. This gives users the pleasing preamp and overdrive tone of a tube amp with the lowered cost, maintenance and weight of a solid state power amp.

See also
Amplifier
Electronic amplifier
Guitar amplifier
Guitar speaker
Guitar speaker cabinet
Isolation cabinet (guitar)
Valve sound
Bass instrument amplification
Effects unit
Distortion (guitar)
Power attenuator (guitar)
Sound reinforcement system

References

External links 
 Duncan's amp pages: information about valve (tube) guitar amplifiers
 List of books about guitar amplifiers and guitar amplifier tone
Tons of Tones, a website for guitar amplifier modelling on digital multi-effect units 

Rock music instruments
Blues instruments
Sound reinforcement system
Consumer electronics
Loudspeakers